Area code 403 is a telephone area code in the North American Numbering Plan (NANP) for the Canadian province of Alberta. The numbering plan area encompasses the southern third of the province, which includes the Calgary area. This numbering plan area is also served by area codes 587, 825, and 368, which form a complex overlay for all of Alberta.

History 
Area code 403 was one of the original eighty-six area codes assigned by AT&T in 1947. Its numbering plan area (NPA) originally comprised the entire province of Alberta, the Yukon, and the western half of the Northwest Territories. It was the second-largest numbering plan area in the North American Numbering Plan and spanned more than one ninth of the circumference of the planet, from the 49th parallel north to the North Pole. On October 3, 1997, the numbering plan area was reduced to Alberta, and the Canadian territories were split off with the new area code 867.

Within only a year, area code 403 was threatened by exhaustion because of the rapid growth of telecommunication services demand for pagers, cellphones, and computer modems, as well as growing competition among providers. On January 25, 1999, the northern two thirds of Alberta, including Edmonton, was split from 403 and assigned the new area code 780. Generally, everything from Red Deer, Lacombe, and Ponoka southward stayed in 403. Permissive dialing of 403 continued across the province until May 18, 1999. 

Within a decade, area code 403 was close to exhaustion once again. The projected exhaust date was March 2009. The solution for mitigation was to implement area code 587 as a province-wide overlay for both numbering plan areas of the state. Optional ten-digit dialing began on June 23, 2008 and became mandatory on September 12, 2008. On September 20, 2008, Telus Mobility began to assign 587 telephone numbers to new customers in Calgary and Edmonton.

On April 9, 2016, all three numbering plan areas of the province were overlaid with an additional area code, 825.

On January 21, 2022, the province was once again overlaid with another area code, 368.

Local exchange carriers
The incumbent local exchange carrier (LEC) in 403 is Telus. Prior to 1997, the larger 403 included EdTel (Edmonton Telephones, now part of Telus) and Northwestel as incumbent LECs. Prior to 1990, Telus was known as Alberta Government Telephones and was a department of the provincial government.

Service area and central office codes
Calgary (403)-200 201 202 203 204 205 206 207 208 209 210 212 213 214 215 216 217 218 219 220 221 225 226 228 229 230 231 232 233 234 235 236 237 238 239 240 241 242 243 244 245 246 247 248 249 250 251 252 253 254 255 256 257 258 259 260 261 262 263 264 265 266 267 268 269 270 271 272 273 274 275 276 277 278 279 280 281 282 283 284 285 286 287 288 289 290 291 292 293 294 295 296 297 298 299 300 301 303 305 312 313 319 333 338 351 354 355 365 366 367 369 370 371 374 375 383 384 385 386 387 389 390 397 398 399 400 401 402 404 407 408 410 428 437 440 441 444 450 451 452 453 454 455 456 457 461 462 463 464 465 466 467 470 471 472 473 474 475 476 477 478 479 481 483 487 500 503 508 509 510 512 513 514 515 516 517 519 520 521 523 530 531 532 535 536 537 538 539 540 541 542 543 547 554 560 561 567 568 569 570 571 585 589 590 592 604 605 606 607 608 612 613 614 615 616 617 618 619 620 629 630 640 645 648 650 651 656 660 661 662 663 667 668 669 670 671 680 681 685 686 689 690 691 692 693 695 696 697 698 699 700 701 702 703 705 708 710 714 716 717 718 719 720 723 724 726 727 730 731 735 736 744 747 750 764 765 766 767 769 770 771 774 775 776 777 781 796 797 798 799 800 801 802 803 804 805 806 807 808 809 813 815 816 817 818 819 826 827 828 829 830 831 835 836 837 850 852 860 861 862 863 869 870 873 874 875 879 880 888 889 890 891 899 906 909 910 918 919 920 921 922 923 926 927 931 943 944 955 956 966 968 969 970 971 973 974 975 978 984 987 988 990 991 992 993 997 998 999
Acme (403)-546
Airdrie (403)-316 420 768 912 945 948 960 980
Arrowwood (403)-534
Banff (403)-431 497 760 762 763 778 951 985 996
Barons (403)-757
Beiseker (403)-947
Blackfalds (403)-600 885
Brooks (403)-362 363 376 409 427 501 633 793 794 925
Canmore (403)-493 609 621 675 678 679 688 707 812 953 961
Cardston (403)-653 659
Carstairs (403)-337 940
Castor (403)-882
Cereal (403)-326
Claresholm  (403)-468 489 490 625 682 706
Clive (403)-784
Coaldale (403)-345 405
Cochrane (403)-709 840 851 855 907 932 981
Cremona (403)-637
Coutts (403)-344
Crossfield (403)-941 946
Crowsnest Pass (403)-372 459 562 563 564 582 583 623
Diamond Valley (403)-933
Didsbury (403)-335 439 518
Drumheller (403)-321 334 436 494 820 821 823 856
East Coulee (403)-822
Eckville (403)-746
Empress (403)-565
Foremost (403)-867
Fort Macleod (403)-553
Glenwood  (403)-626
High River (403)-336 422 469 498 601 602 603 649 652 841 908
Hill Spring -See Glenwood
Hussar (403)-787
Innisfail  (403)-227
Irricana (403)-935
Irvine (403)-834
Kananaskis Improvement District (403)-591
Lacombe (403)-782 786 789
Lake Louise (403)-434 522
Langdon (403)-936 954
Leslieville (403)-729
Lethbridge (403)-308 315 317 320 327 328 329 330 331 332 353 359 360 380 381 382 388 393 394 524 593 634 635 694 715 795 849 892 894 915 929 942
Lomond (403)-792
Longview (403)-558
Magrath (403)-758 759
Medicine Hat (403)-458 487 488 502 504 525 526 527 528 529 548 580 581 594 712 866 878 905 926 928 952 957 977 979
Milk River (403)-647
Milo (403)-599
Morley (403)-881
Nobleford (403)-824
Okotoks (403)-306 842 917 938 939 982 995
Olds (403)-415 438 507 556 559 586 672 791 994
Picture Butte (403)-732
Pincher Creek (403)-339 432 484 624 627 632 683
Ponoka (403)-704 783 785 790 913 963
Raymond (403)-752
Red Deer (403)-302 304 307 309 314 318 340 341 342 343 346 347 348 349 350 352 356 357 358 373 391 392 396 406 505 506 550 588 596 597 598 713 754 755 848 872 877 896 967 986
Rocky Mountain House (403)-322 418 429 844 845 846 847 871 895
Stettler (403)-323 430 740 741 742 743 916
Stirling (403)-756
Strathmore (403)-324 325 361 480 499 814 901 902 934 962 983
Sylvan Lake (403)-858 864 887
Taber (403)-223 416
Three Hills (403)-443
Trochu (403)-442
Vauxhall (403)-654
Vulcan (403)-485
Warner (403)-642

See also
List of NANP area codes
List of Alberta area codes

External links
CNA exchange list for area +1-403
Telecom archives
 Area Code Map of Canada

References

403
Communications in Alberta
Telecommunications-related introductions in 1947